Syagnik “Sy” Banerjee is an American (of Indian origin) scholar, author, and professor affiliated with the University of Michigan-Flint. He is known for publishing literature on the subjects of digital marketing, data sciences, and public policy in publications such as the Journal of Business Research, the Journal of Public Policy and Marketing, and the Harvard Business Review. His works have been cited more than 800 times in academic journals. He is also known for co-authoring the book M-Powering Marketing in a Mobile World.

Education 
Banerjee graduated from Presidency University, Kolkata with a bachelor’s degree in economics in 1997. He earned an MBA in marketing from International Management Institute in 1999 and a PhD in marketing from the University of Rhode Island.

Career 
Before pursuing a career in academia, Banerjee worked in several jobs for companies such as Eveready Industries, Venture Infotech Group, and Bharti Telecom Group.

In 2006, Banerjee was named a fellow of the AMA-Seth Doctoral Consortium.  Banerjee joined the faculty of the University of Michigan-Flint in 2008 as an assistant professor.  Banerjee also taught a course at Northwestern University, developing and teaching the first academic course on mobile  marketing at Northwestern.

He also became an associate professor at the University of Michigan-Flint  in 2014 and a professor of marketing in 2020.  As of 2022, he is an affiliate professor at the University of Michigan’s Michigan Institute for Data Science (MIDAS).

Banerjee also participated in the OakGov Challenge in 2010, winning third place for his web application OMG Campus.

Banerjee is also an associate editor for the Journal of Consumer Marketing and a member of the editorial board for the European Journal of Marketing and the Journal of Research in Interactive Marketing.

Banerjee co-authored the 2017 book M-Powering Marketing in a Mobile World with Ruby Roy Dholakia and Nikhilesh Dholakia. Banerjee also contributed a chapter titled “India: The Awakening of M-Commerce” to the book M-Commerce: Global Experiences and Perspectives.

Banerjee has also written as a contributor for The Economic Times and Inside Sources.

Selected publications 

 Banerjee, S. S., & Dholakia, R. R. (2008). Mobile advertising: does location based advertising work?. International Journal of Mobile Marketing.
 Banerjee, S., & Yancey, S. (2010). Enhancing mobile coupon redemption in fast food campaigns. Journal of Research in Interactive Marketing. 
 Banerjee, S. S., & Dholakia, R. R. (2012). Location‐based mobile advertisements and gender targeting. Journal of Research in Interactive Marketing, 6(3), 198-214. 
 Poddar, A., Foreman, J., Banerjee, S. S., & Ellen, P. S. (2012). Exploring the Robin Hood effect: Moral profiteering motives for purchasing counterfeit products. Journal of Business Research, 65(10), 1500-1506.
 Banerjee, S., Hemphill, T., & Longstreet, P. (2018). Wearable devices and healthcare: Data sharing and privacy. The Information Society, 34(1), 49-57.
 Banerjee, Syagnik (2019), “Geosurveillance, Location Privacy, and Personalization,” Journal of Public Policy & Marketing, 38 (4), pp: 484–99.

Bibliography 

 Banerjee, S., Dholakia, R. R., Dholakia, N. (2017). M-Powering Marketing in a Mobile World. United States: Business Expert Press. ISBN 9781631570049
 Banerjee, S. S., & Lennon, M. M. (2006). India: The Awakening of M-Commerce. In N. Dholakia, M. Rask, & R. Dholakia (Ed.), M-Commerce: Global Experiences and Perspectives (pp. 133–156). IGI Global ISBN 9781591403173

References 

Living people
Indian scholars
Year of birth missing (living people)

Indian lecturers
Indian editors
American male writers of Indian descent
21st-century American male writers
21st-century American educators
21st-century Indian educators